Valentin Onfroy (born 16 November 1993) is a French rower. He competed in the men's coxless four event at the 2016 Summer Olympics.

References

External links
 

1993 births
Living people
French male rowers
Olympic rowers of France
Rowers at the 2016 Summer Olympics
Place of birth missing (living people)
World Rowing Championships medalists for France